Swan is a city in Marion County, Iowa, United States. The population was 76 at the time of the 2020 census.

Geography
Swan is located at  (41.466268, -93.311197).

Demographics

2010 census
As of the census of 2010, there were 72 people, 29 households, and 22 families residing in the city. The racial makeup of the city was 93.1% White, 4.2% African American, 1.4% from other races, and 1.4% from two or more races. Hispanic or Latino of any race were 4.2% of the population.

There were 29 households, of which 44.8% had children under the age of 18 living with them, 41.4% were married couples living together, 17.2% had a female householder with no husband present, 17.2% had a male householder with no wife present, and 24.1% were non-families. 17.2% of all households were made up of individuals, and 3.4% had someone living alone who was 65 years of age or older. The average household size was 2.48 and the average family size was 2.86.

The median age in the city was 37.5 years. 34.7% of residents were under the age of 18; 4.2% were between the ages of 18 and 24; 23.5% were from 25 to 44; 20.9% were from 45 to 64; and 16.7% were 65 years of age or older. The gender makeup of the city was 47.2% male and 52.8% female.

2000 census
As of the census of 2000, there were 121 people, 39 households, and 31 families residing in the city. The racial makeup of the city was 100.00% White.

There were 39 households, out of which 43.6% had children under the age of 18 living with them, 64.1% were married couples living together, 5.1% had a female householder with no husband present, and 20.5% were non-families. 20.5% of all households were made up of individuals, and 5.1% had someone living alone who was 65 years of age or older. The average household size was 3.10 and the average family size was 3.61.

In the city, the population was spread out, with 34.7% under the age of 18, 6.6% from 18 to 24, 28.9% from 25 to 44, 19.0% from 45 to 64, and 10.7% who were 65 years of age or older. The median age was 32 years. For every 100 females, there were 105.1 males. For every 100 females age 18 and over, there were 132.4 males.

The median income for a household in the city was $32,750, and the median income for a family was $38,125. Males had a median income of $20,833 versus $17,083 for females. The per capita income for the city was $12,936. There were 11.4% of families and 12.0% of the population living below the poverty line, including 15.4% of under eighteens and 9.5% of those over 64.

Education
The Pleasantville Community School District operates local public schools.

References

Cities in Marion County, Iowa
Cities in Iowa